Leipzig Hauptbahnhof (Leipzig main station) is the central railway terminus in Leipzig, Germany, in the district Mitte. At , it is Europe's largest railway station measured by floor area. The two Leipzig City Tunnel platforms were inaugurated in December 2013.

The station is operated by DB Station&Service, a subsidiary of Deutsche Bahn, and is classified as a Category 1 station, one of twenty in Germany. It also functions as a large shopping centre. Train services are operated by Deutsche Bahn, S-Bahn Mitteldeutschland, Erfurter Bahn and Mitteldeutsche Regiobahn. As of 2008, Leipzig Hauptbahnhof handled an average of 120,000 passengers per day.

In 2021, Leipzig Hauptbahnhof was ranked the best railway station in Europe.

History

After the opening of the Leipzig–Dresden railway line in 1839, followed by the Magdeburg-Leipzig railway one year later, the Leipzig–Hof railway in 1842, and the Leipzig–Großkorbetha railway in 1856, Leipzig had become the most important railway junction in the Kingdom of Saxony. Initially trains departed from separate termini, such as Bayerischer Bahnhof, located Southeast of the Leipzig city centre. While the city's population increased sharply, especially upon German unification in 1871, the spatial separation proved to be complicated and ineffective.

By 1895, the Saxon railway lines were nationalized under the umbrella of the Royal Saxon State Railways, while the lines of the former Magdeburg–Halberstadt, Berlin-Anhalt, and Halle-Sorau-Guben railway companies had been incorporated into the Prussian state railways. Already in 1875, plans for the establishment of a united German imperial railway organisation, as proposed by Albert von Maybach, had failed due to the antagonism of the Central German states, notably by the Saxon government. Therefore, two state railways rivalled to meet the demands of a steadily growing transport volume in the Leipzig area.

Finally in 1898, the Leipzig city council decided on a joint terminal for Royal Saxon and Prussian state railways north of the city centre. A building contract with both organisations was signed in 1902 and an architectural competition with 76 participants was held in 1906. The winning design by the architects William Lossow (1852–1914) and Max Hans Kühne (1874–1942) featured two identical domed entrance halls facing the street, one for each company. The foundation stone was laid on 16 November 1909 and the platforms were gradually brought into operation station from 1912 onwards. When construction works finished on 4 December 1915, Leipzig Hauptbahnhof had become one of the world's largest railway stations with 26 platforms.

The separate administration of the Saxon and Prussian parts of the station continued even after World War I and the establishment of the nationwide Deutsche Reichsbahn railway organisation in 1920. Not until 1934 Leipzig Hauptbahnhof as a whole was assigned to the Reichsbahn directorate in Halle. By 1939, it had become one of Germany's busiest railway stations. The building was severely damaged by Allied bombing during World War II when during an air raid by the US Eighth Air Force on 7 July 1944 the roof over the concourse collapsed and the western entrance hall was destroyed. Numerous travellers and railway employees were killed. Rail traffic discontinued completely in April 1945.

After the war, train service was quickly resumed. The hardly damaged eastern entrance hall was restored by 1949, and the western hall was rebuilt to its original appearance by the Deutsche Reichsbahn railway company of East Germany in the early 1950s. The concourse, however, remained without a roofing, until in 1954 the East German Council of Ministers resolved upon a complete reconstruction. The full restoration of Leipzig Hauptbahnhof was finished on 4 December 1965, 50 years after its inauguration.

After German reunification the station was renovated and modernized by the Deutsche Bahn AG. The concourse floor was removed and two basement levels were dug out to create a shopping mall. Other areas of the building were largely restored and modernized at the time. The Design and Planning were done by the architectural firm HPP based in Düsseldorf. The modified station building was inaugurated on 12 November 1997.

The Leipzig City Tunnel, an underground railway line between the south of Leipzig and Hauptbahnhof via the central Markt station, opened on 14 December 2013. Further modifications of platforms and tracks are currently being carried out in the course of the construction of the Erfurt–Leipzig/Halle high-speed railway line, part of the European Berlin–Palermo railway axis.

Historic exhibits
On the site of closed track No. 24, several historical Deutsche Reichsbahn locomotives are on display:
 Class 52 steam locomotive 52 5448-7
 Class SVT 137 Diesel multiple unit 137 225
 Class E04 AC electric locomotive E04 01
 Class E44 AC electric locomotive E44 046
 Class E94 AC electric locomotive E94 056

Movie set
Leipzig Hauptbahnhof served as a backdrop for several films, such as
Shining Through (1992)
Obsession (1997)
Mr. Nobody (2009).

Train services

The following services currently call at the station:

Long distance

Regional and S-Bahn

Gallery

References

External links
 

Railway stations in Germany opened in 1915
Hauptbahnhof
Hauptbahnhof